"Boss of Me" is a song by alternative rock band They Might Be Giants. The song is famously used as the opening theme song for the television show Malcolm in the Middle, and was released as the single from the soundtrack to the show. In 2002, "Boss of Me" won the band their first Grammy Award, in the category of Best Song Written for a Motion Picture, Television or Other Visual Media. The song was one of the band's most commercially successful singles and is one of their best-known songs. The song was originally written with the chorus "Who's gonna guess the dead guy in the envelope" for a contest presented by the Preston and Steve show during their Y-100 days.

Release
"Boss of Me" was released commercially in the United Kingdom, Australia and mainland Europe. Mainland Europe was given a separate release from the British release, which had different cover artwork and a different track listing. The single was marketed as the single from the soundtrack album, Music from Malcolm in the Middle, but the B-sides to all releases were tracks from They Might Be Giants albums, as opposed to being other tracks from the soundtrack album. "Reprehensible" comes from the band's 1999 internet-only album, Long Tall Weekend. "Mr. Xcitement" went on to be included on their album Mink Car, released two months after the single. "Boss of Me" charted in three countries, reaching number 21 in the UK, 89 in the Netherlands, and saw the band's first appearance on the Australian Singles Chart, reaching number 29.

Music video 

The "Boss of Me" music video was directed by Ted Crittenden. It is based on Malcolm in the Middle, and contains the characters and set from the show. It begins with Dewey going through a dumpster that says "TMBG Toys". He climbs out of the dumpster and rides his bike home while dragging the box full of toys. The band is performing inside the box. The box goes into Dewey's backyard where Malcolm is raking leaves, their father, Hal, is cooking on a barbecue, and Reese is using hedge clippers on a tree. Dewey opens the box, revealing toy versions of TMBG. But whenever there's a close-up in the box, it is the real band in miniature. A Hawaiian hula dancer toy joins TMBG as Dewey sways back and forth with her. Malcolm and Reese begin shooting the toys with paintball guns until one of them accidentally shoots Hal. Though not shown, it's presumed to have been Reese who shot him as he is later seen using a weed whacker. The John Flansburgh toy is lying in the grass with his arm detached. Reese spots him and, while using the weed whacker, launches him onto the grill where Hal accidentally eats him, much to Dewey's shock. Later, the John Linnell toy is placed in a model airplane that is launched across the street before curving back and landing on the driveway. As Hal drives up, he picks up the airplane to examine it. The plane explodes because it still had a lit fuse. Hal then angrily gathers the TMBG toys into the box and drives back to the dumpster where he promptly tosses it back in.

Cover versions
The ska-punk band Less Than Jake covered the short televised version of the song for their album TV/EP.

Formats and track listing
All songs written by They Might Be Giants, unless otherwise noted.
UK / Australian CD single
"Boss of Me" – 2:56
"Reprehensible" – 3:17
"Mr. Xcitement" (D. Levine, The Elegant Too, They Might Be Giants, M. Doughty) – 2:23

UK cassette single
"Boss of Me" – 2:56
"Reprehensible" – 3:17

European CD single
"Boss of Me" – 2:56
"Mr. Xcitement" (D. Levine, The Elegant Too, They Might Be Giants, M. Doughty) – 2:23
"Birdhouse in Your Soul" (live) – 3:11

Chart positions

References

External links
"Boss Of Me" at This Might Be A Wiki

2001 singles
Comedy television theme songs
They Might Be Giants songs
PIAS Recordings singles
Malcolm in the Middle
Grammy Award for Best Song Written for Visual Media
Songs written by John Linnell
Songs written by John Flansburgh